Diego Caballo Alonso (born 17 February 1994) is a Spanish professional footballer who plays for Sydney FC  as a left back.

Club career
Caballo was born in Salamanca, Castile and León, and joined Real Madrid's youth setup in 2009, from UD Salamanca. He made his senior debut with the C-team on 24 August 2013, starting in a 1–0 Segunda División B away win against Atlético Madrid B.

Caballo first appeared with the reserves on 24 August 2014, playing the full 90 minutes in a 1–2 loss at the same opponent also for the third division championship. He scored his first senior goal with the C's on 19 October, netting the opener in a 2–0 Tercera División home defeat of CD Móstoles URJC.

On 7 July 2015, free agent Caballo signed for Valencia CF, being assigned to the B-team also in the third tier. He moved to another reserve team on 2 July 2017, after agreeing to a contract with Deportivo Fabril in the same division.

On 5 July 2018, Caballo renewed his contract with Dépor for two seasons. On 13 August, he was definitely promoted to the main squad in Segunda División.

Caballo made his professional debut on 17 August 2018, starting in a 1–1 away draw against Albacete Balompié. On 2 September of the following year, he terminated his contract with Dépor, and signed a one-year deal with fellow second division side Extremadura UD the following day.

On 22 January 2020, Caballo cut ties with Extremadura and agreed to a two-and-a-half-year contract with Albacete Balompié, still in the second division.

On 13 July 2022, Caballo signed for Australian A-League club Sydney FC.

References

External links
Real Madrid profile

1994 births
Living people
Sportspeople from Salamanca
Spanish footballers
Footballers from Castile and León
Association football defenders
Segunda División players
Segunda División B players
Tercera División players
Real Madrid C footballers
Real Madrid Castilla footballers
Valencia CF Mestalla footballers
Deportivo Fabril players
Deportivo de La Coruña players
Extremadura UD footballers
Albacete Balompié players
Sydney FC players
21st-century Spanish people